Davy De Beule (born 7 November 1981) is a Belgian former professional footballer who played as a right midfielder.

Career
De Beule was born in Hamme. He signed at Hamme at the age of 6 and moved to Lokeren in 1992. Six years later he entered the first team squad of the club. He played a total of 128 games for Lokeren. In the 2002–03 season, he played a fundamental role in the club's achievement of third place in the national championship, and was named Belgian Young Professional Footballer of the Year. He stayed at Lokeren until 2004, when he moved to Gent. With Gent he reached the final of the 2007–08 Belgian Cup, also placing fourth in the national championship in 2006 and 2007. In 2009 he moved to Kortrijk, where he stayed until 2011. Next, he joined Roda of the Eredivisie. In his first season at Roda he played 24 games and scored 4 goals. In 2014 he moved to Beerschot Wilrijk, where in 2017 he ended his professional career as a player.

International career
In his top year at Lokeren he was selected for Belgium national football team, but got injured during training and thus wasn't able to debut with the national team.

Honours

Club
Lokeren
Belgian First Division A third place: 2002–03

Gent
Belgian Cup runner-up: 2007–08
UEFA Intertoto Cup runner-up: 2006, 2007

Individual
Belgian Young Professional Footballer of the Year: 2002–03

References

External links
 Voetbal International profile 
 
 

1981 births
Living people
People from Hamme
Association football midfielders
Belgian footballers
K.S.C. Lokeren Oost-Vlaanderen players
K.A.A. Gent players
K.V. Kortrijk players
Roda JC Kerkrade players
K Beerschot VA players
Belgian Pro League players
Eredivisie players
Belgian expatriate footballers
Belgian expatriate sportspeople in the Netherlands
Expatriate footballers in the Netherlands
Footballers from East Flanders